In the 2002–03 season Panathinaikos played for 44th consecutive time in Greece's top division, Alpha Ethniki. They also competed in UEFA Cup and Greek Cup. Their season started with Sergio Markarián as team manager.

Squad
As of 24 February 2002.

Team kit

Competitions

Alpha Ethniki

Classification

UEFA Cup

First round

Second round

Third round

Fourth round

Quarter-finals

References

External links
 Panathinaikos FC official website

Panathinaikos F.C. seasons
Panathinaikos